Gmina Konstancin-Jeziorna is an urban-rural gmina (administrative district) in Piaseczno County, Masovian Voivodeship, in east-central Poland.

The gmina contains part of the protected area called Chojnów Landscape Park.

Villages
Apart from the town of Konstancin-Jeziorna, Gmina Konstancin-Jeziorna contains the villages and settlements of Bielawa, Borowina, Cieciszew, Ciszyca, Czarnów, Czernidła, Gassy, Habdzin, Kawęczyn, Kawęczynek, Kępa Okrzewska, Kierszek, Łęg, Obórki, Obory, Okrzeszyn, Opacz, Parcela-Obory, Piaski, Słomczyn and Turowice.

Neighbouring gminas
Gmina Konstancin-Jeziorna is bordered by Warsaw, by the towns of Józefów and Otwock, and by the gminas of Góra Kalwaria, Karczew and Piaseczno.

References
 Polish official population figures 2006

Konstancin-Jeziorna
Gmina Konstancin Jeziorna